Huzzah Creek is a  clear-flowing stream in the southern part of the U.S. state of Missouri. According to the information in the Ramsay Place Names File at the University of Missouri, the creek's name "is evidently derived from" Huzzaus, one of the early French versions of the name of the Osage people.

The Huzzah's headwaters are in the Mark Twain National Forest in northern Reynolds County.  It flows northward through the Missouri Ozarks, roughly paralleling the course of Courtois Creek to its east, until it enters the Meramec River shortly after passing under the Crawford County Highway E bridge. Along its course it flows through the Dillard Mill State Historic Site and, near its confluence with the Meramec, the  Huzzah Conservation Area.

The creek is popular for camping, canoeing, kayaking, and rafting. It is surrounded by limestone bluffs and stands of native pine, oak, and hickory trees; and at normal water levels it has no sections of difficulty greater than grades I and II. The St. Louis Riverfront Times cited the creek as the "Best River for Float Trips" in 2011.

References

External links

 Southwest Paddler: Huzzah Creek
 Missouri Canoe and Floater's Association: Huzzah Creek & Courtois Creek

Rivers of Missouri
Rivers of Reynolds County, Missouri
Rivers of Crawford County, Missouri
Tributaries of the Meramec River